Salam Khodr is a Lebanese journalist and correspondent at Aljazeera. She covered domestic politics in Lebanon, war in Libya in 2011, among other conflict zones in Africa and Asia. In 2009, she also covered the flotilla aid ship to Gaza that was seized by Israel.

References

Living people
Lebanese journalists
Year of birth missing (living people)